Adrião Acácio da Silveira Pinto (born late 18th century – died 1868) served as a staff officer (Captain later Lieutenant-General) during Liberal Wars in the Duke of Terceira's army which landed in the Algarve and marched north to Lisbon in 1833. Later he was appointed to be a Portuguese colonial administrator who held the position of Governor of Macau between 1837 and 1843. During Opium Wars fearing Chinese reprisals he requested British community to leave Macau, British sailed off to Hong Kong on August 1839. Later he was Governor-General of Province of Angola between 1848 and 1851.

See also 
 List of colonial governors of Angola
 History of Angola

References

Governors of Macau
Governors of Portuguese Angola
18th-century births
1868 deaths